The Melitians, sometimes called the Church of the Martyrs, were an early Christian sect in Egypt. They were founded about 306 by Bishop Melitius of Lycopolis and survived as a small group into the eighth century. The point on which they broke with the larger Catholic church was the same as that of the contemporary Donatists in the province of Africa: the ease with which lapsed Christians were received back into communion. The resultant division in the church of Egypt is known as the Melitian schism.

Start of the schism, 306–311
During the Diocletianic Persecution, Melitius was imprisoned alongside Patriarch Peter I of Alexandria in 305/306. He advocated the open practice of Christianity in the face of official persecution, including the celebration of the liturgy, and urged Christians not to go into hiding. He and Peter were released during a lull in the persecutions, and Peter laid down terms for the readmission of "lapsed" Christians, i.e., those who had abjured the faith under persecution. Melitius found his terms too lax and during the dispute that followed he ordained some of his supporters. Peter excommunicated him.

When the persecutions flared up again, Peter was killed (311) and Melitius was condemned to the mines. He was released by the Edict of Serdica (311), but the persecutions came to a permanent end only with the Edict of Milan in 313. When Melitius returned to Egypt, he founded what he called the Church of the Martyrs with clergy of his own ordination. The name "Melitians" was at first used only by the sect's opponents, who sought thereby to contrast them (as heretics) with true Christians. It was also used by the imperial chancery. The name eventually lost its negative connotations and was adopted by the sect.

Attempts to resolve the schism: Nicaea (325) and Tyre (335)
Peter's successor as patriarch, Achillas, failed in his short pontificate to resolve the growing crisis. His successor, Alexander I, who came to power in 313, sought to heal the schism in the Egyptian church in order to better combat the Arian heresy, since the Melitians' Christology was sound. In 325 the Council of Nicaea under the Emperor Constantine I attempted to incorporate the Melitians into the now legal church. The council agreed to grant Melitian priests "full clerical privileges" if they were willing to forswear schism and "acknowledge the authority" of the patriarch of Alexandria. It was permitted for Melitian clergy to be elected to succeed Catholic bishops and Melitius himself was to remain a bishop with no fixed see. He was not restored to Lycopolis. Melitius submitted to the council a list of his bishops and clergy known as the Breviarium Melitii. The list shows a Melitian presence along the whole length of Egypt and there is little evidence for the theory that the centre of Melitian strength was in Upper Egypt. There were 28 Melitian bishops in 325, and several had Coptic names.

The period of concord lasted three years. Melitius died in 327, having appointed John Archaph as his successor. In 328, Athanasius was elected in absentia to succeed Alexander I as patriarch. Encouraged by Eusebius of Nicomedia, the Melitians went into schism and elected a rival patriarch named Theonas with the support of the Arians. A certain Pistos, a friend of Arius, was even ordained a bishop in the Melitian church. It is unclear if or to what extent the Melitians' Christology had been influenced by or approximated to Arianism in this period. In several letters, the Melitians accused Athanasius of beating their bishops, even of murdering one, and of desecrating Melitian liturgical vessels. As a result of these accusations, Athanasius was condemned at the Council of Tyre and forced into exile in 335. Athanasius responded in his famous anti-Arian tracts Apologia contra Arianos and Historia Arianorum by accusing the Melitians of lying and conspiring with Arians to unseat him. Constantine I reacted to the excesses of the Council of Tyre by exiling the Melitian clergy, including John.

Survival as a monastic movement
The names of the leaders of the sect following John Archaph (who is not mentioned after 335) are not known. Athanasius continued to refer to them as an ongoing threat in his writings of the 350s and 360s. He claims in his biography of Anthony the Great that the Melitians claimed the hermit saint as one of their own. As a schismatic sect, the Melitians declined in importance by 400, but they did not disappear. They are mentioned in the writings of Cyril of Alexandria (d. 444) and Shenoute (d. c. 465) and persisted into the eighth century (after the Arab conquest of Egypt) as a small monastic sect.

Numerous papyri have been discovered bearing evidence of a Melitian monasticism flourishing in the Egyptian desert in the fourth century. It is clear that Melitian monks lived in communities, but is not certain if these were tightly structured arrangements like the coenobia of the Pachomians or loose quasi-eremitic groupings like the monasteries of Nitria and Scetis. Timothy of Constantinople, in his On the Reception of Heretics written towards 600, says of the Melitians that "they engaged in no [theological] error, but must pronounce their schism anathema" to rejoin the church. According to the History of the Patriarchs of Alexandria by John the Deacon, some Melitians were reconciled to the Coptic Patriarchate of Alexandria by the efforts of Bishop Moses of Letopolis late in the reign of Patriarch Michael I (died 767).

According to Theodoret (d. c. 460), the Melitians developed unique forms of worship that included hand clapping and music. It has been argued that the movement was dominated by Copts (native Egyptian speakers). Coptic papyri, the writings of the Pachomians and mentions in the writings of Shenoute lend some weight to this view.

Notes

Citations

Bibliography

Christian denominations established in the 4th century
Schisms in Christianity
Eastern Christian monasticism